Events from the year 1785 in France.

Incumbents 
Monarch: Louis XVI

Events

January
7 January - French balloonist Jean-Pierre Blanchard crosses the English Channel in a balloon

July
16 July -  The Piper-Heidsieck Champagne house is founded by Florens-Louis Heidsieck in Reims, France.

August
15 August -  Cardinal de Rohan is arrested in Paris; the Necklace Affair comes into the open.

Date unknown
 Cabinet des Modes, the first fashion magazine, is published in France.

Births
10 February - Claude-Louis Navier
27 March - Louis XVII
3 April - François-Jean-Hyacinthe Feutrier
21 April - Charles Joseph, comte de Flahaut
5 May - Charles Xavier Thomas
12 July - Joseph Pelet de la Lozère
30 September - Ange Hyacinthe Maxence, baron de Damas 
5 October - Joseph Bernelle
10 October - Florestan I, Prince of Monaco
13 October - Jean-Charles Persil
28 November 
Federico de Brandsen
Victor de Broglie
22 December - Achille Libéral Treilhard
26 December - Laurent Clerc
 Marie Durand, saint (d. 1864)

Deaths
7 January - Marquis de Bussy-Castelnau
4 February - Donat Nonnotte
8 May - Étienne François, duc de Choiseul 
15 June
Jean-François Pilâtre de Rozier, during failed cross channel balloon flight
20 August - Jean-Baptiste Pigalle
15 November - César Gabriel de Choiseul
18 November - Louis Philippe I, Duke of Orléans

See also

References

1780s in France